Binod Chandra Nayak (2 September 1919 - 15 November 2003) was an  Odia writer. He was known for his writing that was influenced by modern poetry while being romantic. He was awarded the 1970 Kendra Sahitya Akademi award for his poetry collection Sarisrupa.

Early life and career

He was born on 2 September 1919 at Telipalli, Sundargarh. He was a postgraduate in English Literature before working for government of Odisha. He retired as principal of Laxminarayana College, Jharsuguda, in 1978. He also worked as chairman of Odisha Sahitya Akademi. He was awarded with an honorary D.Litt. degree from Sambalpur University. He died in 2003.

Published works
 Haimanti, 1933
 Chandra o Tara - 1951
 Nila Chandrara Upatyaka - 1951

Awards
 Atibadi Jagannath Das Samman - 2000
 Kendra Sahitya Akademi Award - 1970

References

1919 births
2003 deaths
People from Sundergarh district
Recipients of the Sahitya Akademi Award in Odia
Recipients of the Atibadi Jagannath Das Award
Poets from Odisha
Odia-language poets